Jananiyar Hanim (died 12 December 1912) was the Princess consort of Khedive Isma'il Pasha of Egypt.

Life 

Described as a 'wee dwarf of a handsome blonde', Jananiyar married Isma'il Pasha as his second wife before his accession to the throne. She gave birth to six children, the eldest of whom was Isma'il's first born son,  and heir. However, four of them, including the first born, died in childhood. Of the surviving, a daughter, Princess Zainab Hanim (died 1875) was born in 1859, followed by a son, Ibrahim Hilmi Pasha (died 1927), born in 1860. After Isma'il's accession to the throne in 1863, she was given the title of "Second Princess", a position at which she remained throughout his entire reign, until his deposition in 1879. In Egypt she was known as Ortangi Hanim or Middle Lady. She was Isma'il's favourite wife.

Isma'il and her mother-in-law Hoshiyar Qadin launched a propaganda campaign in Istanbul. In February 1863, Pertevniyal Sultan arranged for Isma'il to meet her son Sultan Abdulaziz in private in her palace. In summer of 1864, Hoshiyar traveled to Istanbul, to help her son. She arrived with proposed new heir in question, her grandson Tewfik Pasha, lots of money, and diplomacy. In spring of 1866, they launched the greatest attack, in which the good offices of Pertevniyal may have been involved. In fact it was Jananiyar who conducted delicate negotiations with consummate ability at Istanbul, and who in gaining her husband's cause, thus ensured the throne to Tewfik.

In 1869, she met with the Princess of Wales Alexandra of Denmark, when the latter visited Istanbul with her husband Prince of Wales Edward (future Edward VII).

In 1874, her daughter Zainab married Ibrahim Fahmi Pasha, son of Ahmad Rifaat Pasha. The princess, however, died before the marriage was consummated. After which, Ibrahim Fahmi married Princess Nimatullah Hanim, Isma'il's youngest daughter by the concubine Neshedil Qadin in 1890.

Jananiyar was widowed at Isma'il's death in 1895.

Death 
Jananiyar Hanim died on 12 December 1912 in the Saffron Palace, Cairo, and was buried in the Khedival Mausoleum, Al-Rifa'i Mosque. She was the last surviving wife of Isma'il.

See also
List of consorts of the Muhammad Ali Dynasty

References

Sources
 (Chennells was the teacher/governess for the daughter Zainab)

External links 

 

1835 births
1912 deaths
Egyptian princesses
Muhammad Ali dynasty
Circassian nobility
Burials in Egypt
Egyptian slaves
Egyptian royal consorts
19th-century Egyptian women